The 1957 Sylvania Television Awards were presented on January 15, 1958, at the Plaza Hotel in New York City. Don Ameche was the master of ceremonies.  The Sylvania Awards were established by Sylvania Electric Products.

The committee presented the following awards:

Special awards

 Face the Nation for its interview of Nikita Khrushchev
 See It Now for its program based on Marian Anderson's goodwill tour abroad
 Mary Martin and Richard Halliday for NBC's presentation of Annie Get Your Gun
 NBC Opera Theatre for "creative achievement in imaginative presentation of classical music"
 Wide Wide World for "outstanding creative coverage of educational subjects"

Category awards
 Original teleplay - William Gibson for The Miracle Worker, Playhouse 90
 Television adaptation - James Lee for The Life of Samuel Johnson on Omnibus
 Actor - Lee J. Cobb in No Deadly Medicine on Studio One
 Actress - Kim Stanley in Traveling Lady on Studio One
 Supporting role actor - Torin Thatcher in Beyond This Place on DuPont Show of the Month
 Supporting role actress - Patty McCormack in The Miracle Worker
 Dramatic series - Hallmark Hall of Fame
 New series - The Twentieth Century
 Documentary series - See It Now
 Network news - NBC
 Public service series - U.N. in Action
 Variety series - The Steve Allen Show
 Comedy series - Jack Paar's Tonight
 Daytime series - Matinee Theater
 Light musical series - The Dinah Shore Chevy Show
 Children's series - Let's Take a Trip
 Religious series - Look Up and Live
 Educational series - Omnibus

References

Sylvania Awards